The Cerro Blanco mine is one of the largest titanium mines in Chile. The mine is located in Atacama Region. The mine has reserves amounting to 116 million tonnes of ore grading 2.1% titanium.

See also 
 List of mines in Chile

References 

Titanium mines in Chile